Heart and Lungs is an EP by the American rock band Truly.  "Heart and Lungs" was featured in the 1992 film Singles.

Track listing 
 "Heart and Lungs" - 4:20
 "The Color Is Magic" - 4:26
 "Truly Drowning" - 4:47
 "Married in the Playground" - 3:30

References

1990 EPs
Truly albums
Sub Pop EPs